The Eastern United States, often abbreviated as simply The East or The East Coast, is a region of the United States located east of the Mississippi River. It includes 26 states and the national capital of Washington, D.C. As of 2011, the region had an estimated population exceeding 179 million, representing over 58 percent of the total U.S. population.

New England

New England is a region of the U.S. located in the northeastern corner of the country, bounded by the Atlantic Ocean, Canada and the state of New York, consisting of the modern states of Maine, New Hampshire, Vermont, Massachusetts, Rhode Island, and Connecticut.

In one of the earliest English settlements in the New World, English Pilgrims from Europe first settled in New England in 1620, in the colony of Plymouth. In the late 18th century, the New England colonies would be among the first North American British colonies to demonstrate ambitions of independence from the British Crown.

New England produced the first examples of American literature and philosophy and was home to the beginnings of free and compulsory public education. In the 19th century, it played a prominent role in the movement to abolish slavery in the United States. It was the first region of the United States to be transformed by the Industrial Revolution.

Mid-Atlantic

The Eastern U.S. includes the seven states of the Mid-Atlantic U.S.: Delaware, Maryland, New Jersey, New York, Pennsylvania, Virginia, West Virginia, and the nation's capital of Washington, D.C.. The region includes New York City, the largest city in the U.S. and a global center of finance and culture, and Philadelphia, the nation's sixth largest city and the  where the Declaration of Independence was signed at Independence Hall in 1776, formally launching the American Revolutionary War, and later the location where the U.S. Constitution was drafted and ratified at Independence Hall in 1789.

Midwest

The Midwestern United States, of referred to as the Midwest, is one of the four geographic regions within the United States that are recognized by the United States Census Bureau.

Five states in the central and inland northeastern US, traditionally considered to be part of the Midwest, can also be classified as being part of the Eastern United States: Illinois, Indiana, Michigan, Ohio, and Wisconsin. A 2006 Census Bureau estimate put the population at 66,217,736. The United States Census Bureau divides this region into the East North Central States (essentially the Great Lakes States) and the West North Central States.

Chicago is the largest city in the region, followed by Columbus and Indianapolis. Chicago has the largest metropolitan statistical area, followed by Detroit, and Minneapolis – Saint Paul. Sault Ste. Marie, Michigan is the oldest city in the region, having been founded by French missionaries and explorers in 1668.

The term Midwest has been in common use for over 100 years. Another term sometimes applied to the same general region is "the heartland". Other designations for the region have fallen into disuse, such as the "Northwest" or "Old Northwest" (from "Northwest Territory") and "Mid-America". Since the book Middletown appeared in 1929, sociologists have often used Midwestern cities (and the Midwest generally) as "typical" of the entire nation. The region has a higher employment-to-population ratio (the percentage of employed people at least 16 years old) than the Northeast, the West, the South, or the Sun Belt states.

Four of the states associated with the Midwestern United States (Kansas, Nebraska, North Dakota, and South Dakota) are also traditionally referred to as belonging in part to the Great Plains region.

Southern United States

The southern United States is a large region of the United States that is sometimes considered to overlap with the Eastern United States, especially in the cases of Delaware, Maryland, Kentucky, Tennessee, Virginia, West Virginia, North Carolina, South Carolina, Georgia, Florida, Alabama, and Mississippi.

Its unique cultural and historic heritage includes the following aspects:
Native American cultures
Early European settlements of English, Scotch-Irish, Scottish and German heritage
Rejecting the Anglican Church as instituted by Great Britain and resorting to other denominations of Protestantism
Helping partake in the American Revolutionary War
Importation of hundreds of thousands of enslaved Africans
Growth of a large African American population
Reliance on slave labor from early 1600s to mid-1800s
Southern yeoman farmers that differed from the planter class
Legacy of the Confederacy after American Civil War
Civil rights movement
Emergence of the New South

These aspects among other things, led to "the South" developing distinctive customs, literature, musical styles, and varied cuisines, that have profoundly shaped traditional American culture.

A shift from mainly a rural society, to more cities and metropolitan areas becoming urbanized, started to largely form following World War II in the 1940s. Since the late 20th century, certain Southern states and areas have seen great economic growth. This growth has led to many migrants moving to southern states, including many that are in the eastern United States. In 2020, Fortune 500 companies headquartered in eastern southern states included: Virginia with 22, Georgia with 18, Florida with 18, North Carolina with 13, and Tennessee with 10.

Major population centers
The following is a list of the 25 largest cities in the Eastern United States, based on 2021 population estimates:

See also
East Coast of the United States

References

External links

 
Regions of the United States
Articles containing video clips